District council elections were held in South Kesteven in 1987.

Results

Deeping St James Ward

Market and West Deeping Ward

References

1987
1987 English local elections
1980s in Lincolnshire